The following are the national records in speed skating in Russia maintained by the Russian Skating Union.

Men

Women

References

External links
 Russian Skating Union web site
 Russian records

National records in speed skating
Records
Speed skating
Speed skating-related lists